Sercan Kaya (born 15 March 1988) is a Turkish professional footballer who plays as a midfielder for Darıca Gençlerbirliği.

References

External links
 
 

1988 births
Footballers from İzmir
Living people
Turkish footballers
Turkey youth international footballers
Association football midfielders
Bucaspor footballers
Trabzonspor footballers
1461 Trabzon footballers
Çaykur Rizespor footballers
Adana Demirspor footballers
MKE Ankaragücü footballers
Adanaspor footballers
Şanlıurfaspor footballers
Gümüşhanespor footballers
Darıca Gençlerbirliği footballers
Süper Lig players
TFF First League players
TFF Second League players
TFF Third League players